Berner is a surname. Notable people with the surname include:

Berner (rapper), San Francisco rapper
Alexander Berner (born 1901), Swiss skeleton racer who competed in the late 1920s
Boel Berner (b. 1945), Swedish sociologist, historian, and editor
Bruno Berner (born 1977), former Swiss footballer
Carl Berner (disambiguation), various people
Friedrich Wilhelm Berner (1780–1827), German organist and composer
Geoff Berner (born 1971), Canadian musician and writer
Peter Berner, Australian comedian, presenter, and artist
Robert Berner (1935–2015), American scientist
Sara Berner (1912–1969), American actress
Vicki Berner (1945–2017), Canadian tennis player

See also
Berner, Georgia